Platysace lanceolata, commonly known as shrubby platysace, is a flowering plant in the family Apiaceae and is endemic  to south-eastern Australia. It is small, upright shrub with variable shaped leaves and white flowers.

Description

Taxonomy and naming
The species was first formally described by French naturalist Jacques Labillardière in 1805 in the first volume of Novae Hollandiae Plantarum Specimen and given the name Azorella lanceolata. The species was transferred to the genus Platysace in 1917 by English botanist George Claridge Druce and the description was published in The Botanical Exchange Club and Society of the British Isles Report for 1916, Suppl.2

Distribution and habitat
This platysace is a common, widespread species found growing in heath, scrub, open forests, and sometimes sandy situations in New South Wales, Victoria and Queensland.

References

External links
Platysace lanceolata Australasian Virtual Herbarium occurrence data

lanceolata
Flora of the Australian Capital Territory
Flora of New South Wales
Flora of Queensland
Flora of Victoria (Australia)
Taxa named by Jacques Labillardière
Plants described in 1805